83 Cancri is an astrometric binary star system in the northern constellation of Cancer, positioned near the constellation border with Leo. It is a challenge to view with the naked eye, having an apparent visual magnitude of 6.61. Despite having a Flamsteed designation, the system was too faint to be included in the Bright Star Catalogue.

The pair have an orbital period of around 32 days and an eccentricity of about 0.6. The visible member of this system, designated component A, is an F-type main-sequence star with a stellar classification of F4V. Its atmosphere is enhanced with s-process elements, particularly strontium and yttrium, which is attributed to mass transfer from the companion while the latter was on the asymptotic giant branch. The primary is 3.1 billion years old with 1.1 times the mass of the Sun and 1.5 times the Sun's radius. It is radiating 3.1 times the luminosity of the Sun from its photosphere at an effective temperature of 6,218 K. The unseen secondary companion is most likely a high mass white dwarf, having around 1.3 times the Sun's mass.

References

F-type main-sequence stars
White dwarfs
Astrometric binaries
High-proper-motion stars

Cancer (constellation)
Durchmusterung objects
Cancri, 83
080218
045699